Marcos Martín may refer to:
Marcos Martín (cartoonist) (born 1972), Spanish comic book artist
Marcos Martín (footballer) (born 1968), Spanish footballer